Solal of the Solals is a 1930 novel by the Swiss writer Albert Cohen. It was published in English in 1933. It was Cohen's first novel, and the first part in a loosely connected series of four; it was followed by Nailcruncher, Belle du Seigneur and Les Valeureux.

Reception
The book was reviewed in Time in 1933: "Publishers, like other advertisers, cry 'Wolf! Wolf!' to a semi-attentive public. ... Consequently, in those blue moons when they have something to shout about, a sharp-toothed masterpiece may slip undetected into the gentle reader's fold, cause much silent havoc before the alarm is given. Though Publisher Dutton has sounded no extra-special warning, Solal is such a masterpiece-in-sheep's-clothing. Wolf would be a misnomer: nothing so leonine has come down the pike in many a blue moon."

See also
 1930 in literature
 Swiss literature

References

1930 novels
French-language novels
Novels by Albert Cohen
Swiss novels
Éditions Gallimard books